Tanea areolata is a species of predatory sea snail, a marine gastropod mollusk in the family Naticidae, the moon snails.

Description
The size of an adult shell varies between 10 mm and 18 mm.

Distribution
This species is distributed in the Red Sea and in the Indian Ocean along Tanzania and the Mascarene Basin; in the Western Pacific Ocean.

References

 Drivas, J. & M. Jay (1988). Coquillages de La Réunion et de l'île Maurice
 Kabat A.R., Finet Y. & Way K. (1997) Catalogue of the Naticidae (Mollusca: Gastropoda) described by C.A. Récluz, including the location of the type specimens. Apex 12(1): 15-26
  Kabat A.R. (2000) Results of the Rumphius Biohistorical Expedition to Ambon (1990). Part 10. Mollusca, Gastropoda, Naticidae. Zoologische Mededelingen 73(25): 345-380

External links
 

Naticidae